Everybody's Welcome is a musical comedy with a book by Lambert Carroll, lyrics by Irving Kahal, and music by Sammy Fain. The musical has two acts and a prologue.  The story is based on Up Pops the Devil by Frances Goodrich and Albert Hackett.

The musical ran at the Shubert Theater in New York City from October 31, 1931, to February 13, 1932, for a total of 139 performances.  it originated the song "As Time Goes By", with music and lyrics by Herman Hupfeld. The song was part of the "additional material" provided for the musical by songwriters other than Kahal and Fain.  The musical starred Harriette Lake as Ann Cathway, Ann Pennington as Louella Carroll, Oscar Shaw as Steve Merrick, Jack Sheehan as Biny Hatfield and Frances Williams as Polly Bascom.  It was directed by William Mollison and choreographed by William Holbrook.

Songs
Prologue
One in a Million – Steve Merrick and Girls 
          
Act 1      
All Wrapped Up in You (Lyrics by Mack Gordon and Harold Adamson; music by Harry Revel) – Steve and Ann Cathway 
Pie Eyed Piper – Polly Bascom, Girls and Boys 
Ta, Ta, Old Bean (Lyrics by Edward Eliscu; music by Manning Sherwin) – Steve, Ann, Polly, and Biny Hatfield 
As Time Goes By (Music and Lyrics by Herman Hupfeld) – Polly 
Even As You and I – Steve and Ann 
Even As You and I (Reprise) – Steve and Ann 
       
Act 2      
Feather in a Breeze – Louella Carroll, Girls and Boys 
Lease in My Heart – Steve and Ann 
Lease in My Heart (Reprise) – Steve, Louella, a Drunk, Boys and Girls 
Nature Played a Dirty Trick on You (Lyrics by Arthur Lippmann and Milton Pascal; music by Sherwin) – Polly and Biny 
As Time Goes By (Reprise) – Polly and Biny 
Even As You and I (Reprise) – Steve and Ann 
I Shot the Works (Lyrics by Pascal and Lippmann; music by Sherwin) – Polly 
Four Grecians – Biny, George Kent, a Drunk and Buddy Hill 
Is Rhythm Necessary? – Polly, Louella, Girls and Boys

External links
Everybody's Welcome at the Internet Broadway Database

1931 musicals
Broadway musicals